Adam Dźwigała (born 25 September 1995) is a Polish professional footballer who plays as a centre-back for FC St. Pauli. He is the son of former footballer Dariusz Dźwigała.

Career
Dźwigała scored his first goal in Ekstraklasa on 3 March 2013 against Górnik Zabrze and became the youngest goalscorer for Jagiellonia Białystok ever.

He joined 2. Bundesliga club FC St. Pauli as a free agent in December 2020 after trialling with the club.

International career

Between 2012 and 2015 Adam Dźwigała represented Poland at the youth levels.

In August 2018 Dźwigała was called up for the Poland national football team for the following matches in September against Italy in the 2018–19 UEFA Nations League season and against the Republic of Ireland, a friendly match.

References

External links
 
 
 

1995 births
Living people
Footballers from Warsaw
Polish footballers
Association football central defenders
Poland youth international footballers
Poland under-21 international footballers
Ekstraklasa players
Primeira Liga players
2. Bundesliga players
ŁKS Łódź players
Jagiellonia Białystok players
Lechia Gdańsk players
Górnik Zabrze players
Górnik Łęczna players
Wisła Płock players
C.D. Aves players
FC St. Pauli players
Polish expatriate footballers
Polish expatriate sportspeople in Portugal
Expatriate footballers in Portugal
Polish expatriate sportspeople in Germany
Expatriate footballers in Germany